The Complete Picture: The Very Best of Deborah Harry and Blondie is a greatest hits album released on March 4, 1991, by Chrysalis Records. It contained all of Blondie's highest-charting singles such as "Heart of Glass", "Sunday Girl", "The Tide Is High", "Atomic", and "Call Me", as well as some of Deborah Harry's solo singles, including the UK top-10 single "French Kissin' in the USA".

Overview
The Complete Picture reached number three on the UK Album Chart, remaining on the chart for 25 weeks, and was certified gold by the British Phonographic Industry (BPI). The album was released as a double vinyl LP, containing five tracks on each side. However, for the compact disc format, all 20 tracks were released on one CD.

A video collection was also released. It omits "Sunday Girl" and "Rip Her to Shreds" since there are no official promo videos for them, though several tracks not present on the album were included such as Deborah Harry's "Backfired" and "Now I Know You Know" (from her 1981 album KooKoo), "Free to Fall" (from 1986's Rockbird), and Blondie's videos for "The Hardest Part" (1979) and "Detroit 442" (1978).

Track listing

CD
 "Heart of Glass" (Faded The Best of Blondie Version) (Harry, Stein) - 3:58
 Performed by: Blondie
 "I Want That Man" (Bailey, Currie) - 3:41
 Performed by: Deborah Harry
 "Call Me"  (Harry, Moroder) - 3:28
 Performed by: Blondie
 "Sunday Girl" (Stein) - 3:02
 Performed by: Blondie
 "French Kissin' in the USA" (Album Version) (Lorre) - 5:10
 Performed by: Debbie Harry
 "Denis" (Levenson) - 2:18
 Performed by: Blondie
 "Rapture"  (The Best of Blondie Version) (Harry, Stein) - 5:33
 Performed by: Blondie
 "Brite Side" (Harry, Stein) - 4:34
 Performed by: Deborah Harry
 "(I'm Always Touched by Your) Presence, Dear" (Valentine) - 2:41
 Performed by: Blondie
 "Well Did You Evah!" (Porter) - 3:27
 Performed by: Deborah Harry & Iggy Pop
 "The Tide Is High" (Album Version) (Barrett, Evans, Holt) - 4:35
 Performed by: Blondie
 "In Love with Love" (Album Version) (Harry, Stein) - 4:30
 Performed by: Debbie Harry
 "Hanging on the Telephone" (Lee) - 2:22
 Performed by: Blondie
 "Island of Lost Souls" (7" Edit) (Harry, Stein) - 3:49
 Performed by: Blondie
 "Picture This" (Destri, Harry, Stein) - 2:56
 Performed by: Blondie
 "Dreaming" (Harry, Stein) - 3:03
 Performed by: Blondie
 "Sweet and Low"  (Phil Harding Single Mix) (C., Harry)  - 4:18
 Performed by: Debbie Harry
 "Union City Blue" (Harrison, Harry) - 3:20
 Performed by: Blondie
 "Atomic" (Album Version) (Destri, Harry) - 4:38
 Performed by: Blondie
 "Rip Her to Shreds" (Harry, Stein) - 3:19
 Performed by: Blondie

VHS
 "Heart of Glass" (Harry, Stein)
 "I Want That Man" (Bailey, Currie)
 "Denis" (Levenson)
 "Call Me"  (Harry, Moroder)
 "French Kissin' in the USA" (Lorre)
 "Hanging on the Telephone" (Lee)
 "Sweet and Low" (C., Harry)
 "The Tide Is High" (Barrett, Evans, Holt)
 "In Love with Love" (Harry, Stein)
 "(I'm Always Touched by Your) Presence, Dear" (Valentine)
 "Brite Side" (Harry, Stein)
 "Picture This" (Destri, Harry, Stein)
 "Rapture" (Harry, Stein)
 "Backfired" (Edwards, Rodgers)
 "Now I Know You Know" (Edwards, Rodgers)
 "Free to Fall" (Harry, Justman)
 "The Hardest Part" (Harry, Stein)
 "Detroit 442" (Destri, Stein)
 "Atomic" (Destri, Harry)
 "Union City Blue" (Harrison, Harry)
 "Dreaming" (Harry, Stein)
 "Island of Lost Souls" (Harry, Stein)
 "Well Did You Evah!" (Porter)

Charts

Weekly charts

Year-end charts

Certifications

References

1991 greatest hits albums
Blondie (band) compilation albums
Chrysalis Records compilation albums
Debbie Harry albums